Gökçepınar can refer to the following villages in Turkey:

 Gökçepınar, Çorum
 Gökçepınar, Dursunbey
 Gökçepınar, Gercüş
 Gökçepınar, Serik